Pathanamthitta Lok Sabha constituency is a Lok Sabha constituencies in Kerala state in southern India. It is a newly formed constituency in the Central Travancore region of Kerala for the election of a member of the Lok Sabha.

The district, which was previously fragmented into different parliamentary constituencies, was unified into a single Parliamentary constituency as per the Delimitation of Parliamentary and Assembly. Constituenciesc Order, 2008.

Assembly Segments

Pathanamthitta Lok Sabha constituency is composed of the following assembly segments:

Members of Parliament

Election results
In the first election held in this district on 16 May 2009,  United Democratic Front (UDF) candidate Anto Antony Punnathaniyil of the Indian National Congress was elected by 408,232 votes over K. Ananthagopan of the Communist Party of India (Marxist) 297,026; B. Radhakrishna Menon of the Bharatiya Janata Party 56,294; K. K. Nair of the Bahujan Samaj Party 22,424; and Mani C. Kappan of the Nationalist Congress Party 4,445 votes.

Indian general election, 2019

According to Election Commission, there are 13,40,193 registered voters in Pathanamthitta Constituency for 2019 Lok Sabha Election. Pathanamthitta Constituency was polled 74.19% of total electorate.

Indian general election, 2014

Indian general election, 2009

See also
 2014 Indian general election
 Indian general election, 2014 (Kerala)
 Kottayam District
 List of Constituencies of the Lok Sabha
 Pathanamthitta district

References

External links
Pathanamthitta Lok Sabha Elections detail results 2019

Lok Sabha constituencies in Kerala
Politics of Pathanamthitta district